Gianmarco Chironi (born 7 September 1997) is an Italian football player.

Club career
He made his Serie C debut for Lecce on 6 May 2018 in a game against Monopoli.

References

External links
 

1997 births
People from Nardò
Footballers from Apulia
Living people
Italian footballers
Association football goalkeepers
U.S. Lecce players
Serie C players
Serie D players
Sportspeople from the Province of Lecce
21st-century Italian people